Adams Township, Ohio, may refer to:

Adams Township, Champaign County, Ohio
Adams Township, Clinton County, Ohio
Adams Township, Coshocton County, Ohio
Adams Township, Darke County, Ohio
Adams Township, Defiance County, Ohio
Adams Township, Guernsey County, Ohio
Adams Township, Lucas County, Ohio, a former township entirely annexed to Toledo, Ohio
Adams Township, Monroe County, Ohio
Adams Township, Muskingum County, Ohio
Adams Township, Seneca County, Ohio
Adams Township, Washington County, Ohio

Ohio township disambiguation pages